Kit Cartwright (born January 4, 1954) is former American football coach. He served as the head football coach at Butler University from 2002 to 2005.  After compiling a 7–36 record at Butler, he was fired as the school's head football coach, effective at the end of the 2005 season.

Cartwright is a native of Toledo, Ohio.  He attended Bowling Green State University, where he played defensive back as a walk-on under head coach Don Nehlen.  He graduated from Bowling Green in 1976.  Since that time, Cartwright has been a football coach at 13 different universities, including Toledo (graduate assistant, 1976), Ohio Wesleyan (defensive coordinator, 1977), Penn State (part-time assistant, 1978), Bowling Green (defensive secondary coach, 1979-1982), Purdue (defensive secondary and receivers coach, 1983–1986), Eastern Illinois (offensive coordinator, 1987–1988), Colorado State (1989–1992), Ball State (offensive coordinator, 1993), Michigan (quarterback and receivers coach, 1994–1995), and Indiana (passing game coordinator, 1996), Butler (offensive coordinator, 1998–2001; head coach, 2002–2005), and DePauw (offensive coordinator, 2006).  He was the position coach for future NFL quarterbacks Tom Brady and Brian Griese while at Michigan.  He was also the offensive coordinator and quarterbacks coach for the Winnipeg Blue Bombers in the Canadian Football League from 2007 to 2008.

Head coaching record

References

1954 births
Living people
American football defensive backs
Ball State Cardinals football coaches
Bowling Green Falcons football players
Bowling Green Falcons football coaches
Butler Bulldogs football coaches
Colorado State Rams football coaches
Eastern Illinois Panthers football coaches
Indiana Hoosiers football coaches
Michigan Wolverines football coaches
Ohio Wesleyan Battling Bishops football coaches
Purdue Boilermakers football coaches
Toledo Rockets football coaches
Winnipeg Blue Bombers coaches
Sportspeople from Toledo, Ohio
Players of American football from Ohio